VIP my Brother Superman, often known in English as The SuperVips, is a 1968 Italian animated film directed by Bruno Bozzetto. It is a parody of superheroes and enjoyed a good commercial and critical success.  In 2008 it was produced a spin-off TV-series in 3D animation, PsicoVip.

Plot
Recounting the adventures of the last in a line of Supermen, the film pokes fun at the processes that lie behind advertising, politics and our consumer society.

Bruno Bozzetto's animated satire about two descendants of superpowered beings, known as the Vips. One of these modern day superheroes—SuperVip, to be exact—is easily recognizable as such, possessing an Adonis-like physique, a dynamic personality and an array of heightened abilities. The other—MiniVip—is not quite so prepossessing. His growth is stunted, he wears horn-rimmed glasses, his paunch is wider than his chest, and his powers are a bit more limited than his brother's, being able only to fly through two little wings while emitting a small glow at night that makes him similar to a firefly. But both Vips are needed when a Happy Betty, lady tycoon with a taste for ruling the world, rears her ugly head. The question is, can MiniVip defeat his worst enemy—his intimidated ego—to help save the day?

Cast
Oreste Lionello as Mini VIP
Fiorella Betti as Lisa  
Micaela Esdra as Nervustrella
Corrado Gaipa as the Colonel
Pino Locchi as Schultz  
Lydia Simoneschi as Happy Betty

Production
VIP, My Brother Superman was the second feature length animation made by director Bruno Bozzetto after his Western spoof West and Soda. 
Bozzetto felt that an American he refers to as Lady Robinson was "a real pain in the ass!" as she would come to Milan and felt "entitled to talk about the film, and came up with mind-blowing bullshit!"  The character known as Happy Betty has slave employees in the film who are Asian, which led to American finances of the film to make objections. Bozzetto stated that Lady Robinson felt the film could not be sold to Japan with the Asian slave characters and asked to make them green.

Release
My Brother Superman was released in Italy in 1968. In the United Kingdom and some other English-speaking countries, it is titled The SuperVips. An airing on Channel 4 in the U.K. in 1990 also used this title. The film was released on DVD in the United States by DigiView Entertainment as Vip, My Brother Superman. The film was also released on October 7, 2014 on All Regions DVD. This is a restored version of this film and the picture quality is improved compared to the DigiView release. The audio is in Italian 5.1 and Italian dual mono. This DVD has extra content, including a 45 minute interview with Bruno Bozzetto, storyboards and original promotional material.

References

Footnotes

Sources

External links
Official website

1968 films
1968 animated films
1960s parody films
Italian animated science fiction films
Italian animated films
Italian superhero films
1960s Italian-language films
Films directed by Bruno Bozzetto
Superhero comedy films
Animated superhero films
1960s superhero films
1968 comedy films
1960s Italian films